Space Island Group (SIG) is a commercial organization based in West Covina, CA that is dedicated to the development of commerce, research, manufacturing and tourism in space. They plan to accomplish this by designing, building and operating commercial space transportation systems and destinations.  Their flagship project is the Space Island Project. They plan to accomplish this through the use of technologies, vehicles and procedures developed by NASA and aerospace companies over the last 25 years.

Space Island Project
The Space Island Project is a project whose goal is to create a stand-alone commercial space infrastructure supporting human business activities in Low Earth orbit (LEO) 400 to 500 miles above earth. The centerpiece of this project is the Space Solar Energy Initiative which will collect energy with solar panel satellites and then beam this energy to receiving towers on Earth using "very weak microwave beams."  The goal was to have a massive space station in Low Earth Orbit with as many as 20,000 passengers to start and doubling the population every decade. This was intended to start by 2020 but this date was not accomplished.

Funding
One of the unique propositions outlined by the Space Island Group is their funding methodology.  They argue that previous attempts at commercial space projects have had a dependency on revenue and subsidies from government agencies, but that they have a funding plan that would be viable through capitalizing on commercial markets such as solar power satellites.

External links
 The Space Island Group web site

Defunct spaceflight companies
Space tourism
Proposed space stations
Aerospace companies of the United States